Luna 1 was the first spacecraft to leave the gravitational influence of Earth. Also in 1959, Luna 2 was the first spacecraft to reach the surface of another celestial body, impacting the Moon, and Luna 3 returned the first images of the far side of the Moon.

Launches

January

|}

February

|}

March

|}

April

|}

May

|}

June

|}

July

|}

August

|}

September

|}

October

|}

November

|}

December

|}

Deep Space Rendezvous

Orbital launch summary

By country

By rocket

By orbit

See also
Timeline of spaceflight

References

Footnotes

1959 in spaceflight
Spaceflight by year